The Chief of Integrated Defence Staff to the Chairman Chiefs of Staff Committee (CISC) is the head of the Integrated Defence Staff which acts as the point organisation for jointmanship in the Ministry of Defence. In November 2019, government sources disclosed the post of Chief of Integrated Defence Staff would be converted to that of Vice Chief of Defence Staff some in the future.

Organisation
The CISC is a Three-star rank officer from the three Services in rotation. The CISC reports to the Chief of Defence Staff in New Delhi. He is assisted by the following five Principal Staff Officers (all three-star appointments) who head the various branches within the IDS. 

 Deputy Chief of Integrated Defence Staff (Policy Planning and Force Development) - DCIDS (PP&FD) 	 
 Deputy Chief of Integrated Defence Staff (Doctrine, Organisation and Training) - DCIDS (DOT) 
 Deputy Chief of Integrated Defence Staff (Operations) - DCIDS (Ops) 
 Director General Defence Intelligence Agency & Deputy Chief of Integrated Defence Staff (Intelligence) - DGDIA & DCIDS (Int) 
 Deputy Chief of Integrated Defence Staff (Medical Branch) - DCIDS (Med)

List of chiefs

See also
 Chief of Defence Staff
 Chairman of the Chiefs of Staff Committee
 Integrated Defence Staff

References

External links
  Official Website - CISC

Indian Army
Indian Navy
Indian Air Force
Indian military appointments